Connan is a surname. Notable people with the surname include:

 François Connan (1508–1551), French humanist jurist
 Konnan (born 1964), the ring name of Charles Ashenoff, American pro-wrestler and rapper
 Tom Connan (born 1995), singer and actor.

See also
 Connan and the Mockasins, a blues-pop band from New Zealand
 Saint-Connan, a commune in the Côtes-d'Armor department of Brittany in northwestern France
 Conan (disambiguation)